The 2001–02 National Division Two was the second version (fifteenth overall) of the third division of the English domestic rugby union competition using the name National Division Two.  New teams to the division included Orrell and Waterloo who were relegated from the 2000–01 National Division One while Stourbridge (champions) and Sedgley Park (playoffs) came up from the 2000–01 National Division Three North and Plymouth Albion as champions of the 2000-01 National Division Three South.  The league points system was 2 points for a win and 1 point for a draw.

The title race was extremely tight and went to the last game with Orrell winning their rescheduled game away to Nottingham to draw dead level with Plymouth Albion at the top of the table and take the title by virtue of a better points difference – the fact Orrell had won both of their games against Plymouth was largely responsible for their victory.  Both sides would be promoted to the 2002–03 National Division One with Orrell making an instant return following their relegation at the start of the season while Plymouth would make it a second promotion in a row.  As well as gaining promotion the Devon-based side would also be easily the most popular side in the division with over 19,000 fans in total attending throughout the season.  At the opposite end of the table Preston Grasshoppers and Waterloo would be the first sides to be relegated, followed by Rosslyn Park who battled to the end but never had quite enough to overtake relegation rivals Stourbridge and Kendal.  Preston and Waterloo would drop down to the 2002–03 National Division Three North while Rosslyn Park went down to the 2002–03 National Division Three South, with Waterloo suffering their second consecutive relegation.  It was quite a turn around for Rosslyn Park who went within a whisker to being promoted the previous season only to be relegated this season.

Participating teams and locations

Final league table

Results

Round 1

Round 2

Round 3

Round 4

Round 5

Round 6

Round 7

Round 8

Round 9

Round 10 

Postponed.  Game rescheduled to 29 December 2001.

Postponed.  Game rescheduled to 29 December 2001.

Round 11

Round 12

Round 13 

Postponed.  Game rescheduled to 16 February 2002.

Round 14 

Postponed.  Game rescheduled to 2 March 2002.

Round 10 (rescheduled games) 

Game rescheduled from 24 November 2001.

Game rescheduled from 24 November 2001.

Round 15 

Postponed. Game rescheduled to 16 February 2002.

Postponed. Game rescheduled to 16 February 2002.

Postponed. Game rescheduled to 20 April 2002.

Postponed. Game rescheduled to 16 February 2002.

Postponed. Game rescheduled to 16 February 2002.

Postponed. Game rescheduled to 16 February 2002.

Round 16

Round 17

Round 18 

Postponed.  Game rescheduled to 2 March 2002.

Round 19

Round 20 

Postponed.  Game rescheduled to 2 March 2002.

Rounds 13 & 15 (rescheduled games) 

Game rescheduled from 5 January 2002.

Game rescheduled from 5 January 2002.

Game rescheduled from 15 December 2001.

Game rescheduled from 5 January 2002.

Game rescheduled from 5 January 2002.

Game rescheduled from 5 January 2002.

Round 21

Rounds 14, 18 & 20 (rescheduled games) 

Game rescheduled from 22 December 2001.

Game rescheduled from 9 February 2002.

Game rescheduled from 26 January 2002.

Round 22

Round 23

Round 24

Round 25

Round 26

Round 15 (rescheduled game) 

Game rescheduled from 5 January 2002.

Total season attendances

Individual statistics 

 Note that points scorers includes tries as well as conversions, penalties and drop goals.

Top points scorers

Top try scorers

Season records

Team
Largest home win — 57 pts
92 - 0 Plymouth Albion at home to Esher on 30 March 2002
Largest away win — 59 pts
67 - 8 Orrell away to Preston Grasshoppers on 16 March 2002
Most points scored — 67 pts
67 - 8 Orrell away to Preston Grasshoppers on 16 March 2002
Most tries in a match — 11
Orrell away to Preston Grasshoppers on 16 March 2002
Most conversions in a match — 8 (x2)
Plymouth Albion at home to Preston Grasshoppers on 23 February 2002
Orrell away to Nottingham on 20 April 2002
Most penalties in a match — 8
Esher at home to Preston Grasshoppers on 1 December 2001
Most drop goals in a match — 2 (x2)
Kendal away to Esher on 10 November 2001
Sedgley park away to Fylde on 1 December 2001

Player
Most points in a match — 30 (x2)
 Colin Stephens for Sedgley Park at home to Wharfedale on 15 December 2001 
 Ben Harvey for Stourbridge at home to Esher on 6 April 2002
Most tries in a match — 4
 Mark Farrar for Harrogate against Preston Grasshoppers on 6 April 2002
Most conversions in a match — 8 (x2)
 Chris Atkinson for Plymouth Albion at home to Preston Grasshoppers on 23 February 2002
 Richard Welding for Orrell away to Nottingham on 20 April 2002
Most penalties in a match —  8
 Jonathon Gregory for Esher at home to Preston Grasshoppers on 1 December 2001
Most drop goals in a match —  2 (x2)
 Mike Scott for  Kendal away to Esher on 10 November 2001
 Colin Stephens for  Sedgley park away to Fylde on 1 December 2001

Attendances
Highest — 2,100
Plymouth Albion at home to Fylde on 5 January 2002
Lowest — 85 
Preston Grasshoppers at home to Newbury Blues on 2 March 2002
Highest Average Attendance — 1,593
Plymouth Albion
Lowest Average Attendance — 250	
Waterloo

See also
 English Rugby Union Leagues
 English rugby union system
 Rugby union in England

References

External links
 NCA Rugby

National
National League 1 seasons